Frans Boenders (b. Antwerp, 28 September 1942) is a Belgian writer. He graduated in Germanic philology and philosophy at the Katholieke Universiteit Leuven. He worked for the Belgian radio as a producer.

Bibliography
 Over Wittgenstein gesproken (1978)
 Denken in tweespraak (1978)
 Sprekend gedacht (1980)
 De goden uit het Oosten (1981)
 Tekens van lezen (1985)
 Tibetaans dagboek: Tibet in de jaren tachtig (1987)
 Kunst als intieme ervaring: over de stille kracht van poëzie (1993)
 Kailash, De Weg van de Berg (1997)
 Schrijvende denkers (2000)
 Europa (2000)
 Het onbestendige landschap (2001)

Awards
 1979 - Arkprijs van het Vrije Woord

See also
 Flemish literature

Sources
 Frans Boenders

1942 births
Flemish writers
Flemish philosophers
KU Leuven alumni
Living people
Ark Prize of the Free Word winners